Diaphoreolis flavovulta, the yellow-head aeolid or yellow-head cuthona, is a species of sea slug, an aeolid nudibranch, a marine gastropod mollusc in the family Trinchesiidae.

Distribution
This species was described from inner Monterey Bay, California, United States. Reported along the East Pacific coastline of America from Kayostia Beach, Clallam County, Washington state to Hazard Canyon, San Luis Obispo County, California.

References

Trinchesiidae
Gastropods described in 1966